A Wolf in Sheep's Clothing is the debut studio album from American hip hop group Black Sheep, released October 22, 1991, on Mercury Records.

The album peaked at number 30 on the Billboard 200 chart. By April 1992, it was certified gold in sales by the RIAA, after sales exceeding 500,000 copies in the United States.

Release and reception

The album peaked at thirty on the U.S. Billboard 200 and reached the fifteenth spot on the R&B Albums chart. It was certified gold in April 1992.

John Bush of AllMusic called the album "playfully satirical, witty, and incredibly imaginative," and stated that "Black Sheep hit a height with their debut that few hip-hop acts would ever reach."

In 1998, the album was selected as one of The Sources 100 Best Rap Albums Ever.

Track listing

Chart history

Weekly charts

Year-end charts

Singles

Personnel
Recording credits based on information from AllMusic:
 William McLean, Andre Titusarranging & production
 Lisle Leeteengineering
 Lisa Cortes, Dave Gossettexecutive production
 Tom Coynemastering
 Gregg Mann, W. McLean, A. Titusmixing
 Angelique Bellamnyvocals
 Chi-Alivocals (background)

References

1991 debut albums
Black Sheep (group) albums
Mercury Records albums